Richard Kind is an American actor, known for his roles as Dr. Mark Devanow in Mad About You (1992–1999, 2019), Paul Lassiter in Spin City (1996–2002), Andy in Curb Your Enthusiasm (2002–2021), and Arthur in A Serious Man (2009). Kind is also known for his voice performances in various Pixar films such as A Bug's Life (1998), the first two films of the Cars franchise (2006–2011), Toy Story 3 (2010), and Inside Out (2015). He was nominated for a Tony Award for Best Featured Actor in a Play for his performance as Marcus Hoff in the 2013 Broadway production of The Big Knife.

Film

Television

Video games

Web

Theatre

References

Male actor filmographies
American filmographies